The Terence McMillan Stadium is a small athletics and football stadium in Plaistow, in the London Borough of Newham of East London, England.

It is named after the first mayor of Newham, Terence McMillan.

It has traditionally been the stadium of the Newham and Essex Beagles Athletic Club since their move from Barking in 1985.

It has one stand with seats for 192 spectators and an overall maximum capacity of 2000. The athletics track was originally cinder although it is not shown on a 1971 OS map. The opening meeting of the synthetic track was on 26 July 1985. It was resurfaced with Polytan PUR in 1995. The athletics track is 8 lanes wide and there are facilities for hammer, discus and long jump events, as well as changing rooms and free parking.

It currently home to Athletic Newham F.C. and since July 2020 Clapton F.C.

It was previously the home of Fire United Christian F.C. (2018-2021) London APSA (1993-2011), Woodford Town F.C. (2016-2017) and Canning Town F.C. (mid-2000s).

References

Sports venues in London
Athletics venues in London
Football venues in London